José Catire Carpio, (born José Algimiro Carpio Velásquez; December 19, 1940 – June 26, 2006), was a Venezuelan llanero singer.

See also
Joropo
Venezuela
Venezuelan music

References 
José Catire Carpio - Llanerisimo.com 
Falleció el cantautor José Catire Carpio - Guarico.com.ve 

1940 births
2006 deaths
People from Guárico
People from El Tigre
Venezuelan folk singers
20th-century Venezuelan  male  singers